A Very Private Plot is a 1994 historical spy novel by William F. Buckley, Jr. It is the tenth  of 11 novels in the Blackford Oakes series. The novel was well received by The New York Times described the novel a full of "grave whimsy with which Mr. Buckley retraces old conflicts" and "deliver[ing] more than mere routine spy thrills."

Plot
In early 1995, CIA agent Blackford Oakes is called to testify before the United States Congress regarding a suspected plot to assassinate Mikhail Gorbachev, president of the Soviet Union.

References

Further reading 
 Buffalo Library listing of both Booklist and Publishers Weekly Reviews

1994 American novels
Blackford Oakes novels
William Morrow and Company books